Adaina excreta is a moth of the family Pterophoridae. It is found in Peru (Carabaya), Argentina and Ecuador.

The thorax, tegulae, mesothorax and abdomen are pale brown-ochreous. The forewings are yellow-ochreous (toward the dorsum grey-mixed) with dark brown markings and grey fringes. The underside is dark brown. The hindwings are brown-grey with grey fringes. The underside is grey-brown.

Adults are on wing in January, June, October and November.

References

Moths described in 1930
Oidaematophorini